Kim Tong-gyu (1915 - unknown) was a politician of the Democratic People's Republic of Korea who served as the Deputy Chairman of the State.

Biography
Kim was born in former Manchuria in northeastern China. He took part in anti-Japanese guerrilla warfare, and studied in Soviet Union.

In 1961, he became a party central committee member of the Workers' Party of Korea. In 1962, he became a delegate of the Supreme People's Assembly. In November 1970, he became a member of the 5th WPK Political Committee at the 5th Congress of the Workers' Party of Korea.

He was elected vice president at the 4th meeting of the 5th convocation of the Supreme People's Assembly in November 1974 and was mainly involved in diplomacy. In June 1976, at the party political committee, he said, "The successor's emergence is too quick. We must strengthen our education with a time that the people can be satisfied with." He criticized the creation of a successor system.

He was purged in October 1977 and was not re-elected as Vice Chairman and Central People's Committee at the 6th session of the 1st session in December 1977. He is assumed to have been purged and exiled due to his opposition to the Kim Jong-il succession, and later detained in a concentration camp.

References

Vice presidents of North Korea
Workers' Party of Korea politicians
Members of the Supreme People's Assembly
1915 births
Year of death missing
People of 88th Separate Rifle Brigade